The Testimony of Truth is the third manuscript from Codex IX of the Nag Hammadi Library. The manuscript is missing a significant number of pages and lines. The text criticizes those who follow the Law of Moses, those who believe they will be saved through martyrdom, those who believe in the version of God portrayed in Genesis, and various Gnostic sects. The author defends the serpent that instructed Adam and Eve in the Garden of Eden and cites Numbers 21:9 to argue that the serpent is Christ. The conclusion emphasizes seeking wisdom and truth.

Summary
The opening addresses those who have searched for truth but have been influenced by the old ways of the Pharisees and the scribes, who belong to the archons. Those who follow the Law are unable to understand the truth and are limited by their carnal desires. The Son of Man, who came from Imperishability, is said to have revealed the truth and struggled against passions. The author warns that those who confess to being Christians only in word and not in power will fall into the hands of the principalities and authorities because of their ignorance. The author also mentions that the Son of Man performed many mighty works, including raising the dead and granting healing to the sick, but that there are still those who are blind guides and cannot raise themselves.

The text argues that those who believe they will be saved through martyrdom are misguided, since salvation is not achieved through death. The text emphasizes the importance of knowledge and self-awareness, which leads to true salvation. The resurrection of the flesh, which many people expect, is instead a path to destruction. True salvation is achieved through understanding and embracing the word of God, and those who do so will be transferred to the heights and achieve eternal life. However, those who receive the word with ignorance will be dominated by defiled pleasures and will not reach heaven. The text also touches on the idea of being born again through the word and the power of the cross to separate light from darkness and males from females.

The writer describes the journey of a man who renounces the material world and turns towards the truth to gain knowledge of God and himself. He gains wisdom and insight, breaking free from the constraints of the material world and entering into imperishability. The text also mentions the births of John the Baptist and Christ and encourages the reader to seek the mysteries behind their births. When a person knows both themselves and God, they will be saved and receive a crown of unfading glory.

The text criticizes the God of the Law as portrayed in Genesis, calling him malicious and jealous. The author argues that the serpent that instructed Adam and Eve in the Garden of Eden is Christ, citing the bronze serpent from Numbers 21:9. The text argues that simply saying "we believe in Christ" is not enough and that true faith requires a spiritual understanding of Christ. The book of the generation of Adam is written for those who follow the Law, but the author believes that the true meaning of the stories and teachings can only be understood spiritually.

The latter part of the text is heavily damaged. It appears to be discussing different Gnostic sects and their leaders, including Valentinus, Basilides, and Simon Magus. It critiques the teachings of these leaders and their followers, who are said to not truly understand salvation. The author claims to belong to the "generation of the Son of Man" and to have revealed truth but acknowledges the difficulty of finding true wisdom. The text mentions the Savior, the disciples, and that wisdom comes from above and is guarded by power. It speaks about those who have been released from the flesh and have become undefiled, showing they are from the "generation of the Son of Man." Those who renounce desires and control their bodies are also from this generation and have the power to accuse the wicked, who are controlled by unrighteous Mammon, the father of sexual intercourse.

The conclusion emphasizes the importance of finding the life-giving word and coming to know the Father of Truth. This leads to rest and an end to seeking. The baptism of truth is achieved through renunciation of the world and those who only say they are renouncing it are lying. Some have fallen away to worship idols or have demons dwelling with them. The author presents various mysteries, such as David, Solomon, and the demons, but does not reveal their meaning. The free man is pure and set apart, not envious. The author warns against being misled by false teachings and preachers. The power of Sabaoth, through heresies, works against the law in Christ.

References

The Testimony of Truth
3rd-century works
Nag Hammadi library